Morty Gunty (February 1, 1929 – July 15, 1984) was an American actor and comedian well known among New York City nightclub comics in the 1960s and 1970s.

Gunty attended Midwood High School in Brooklyn, New York.  He was born and died in the Parkville section of Brooklyn, New York. He appeared on The Ed Sullivan Show on February 23, 1964, following the Beatles after their third and final appearance on the program.

In addition to being a nightclub comic, in the mid-1960s, he hosted a 90-minute weekday afternoon children's television series on WOR-TV New York called The Funny Company. Gunty also appeared on Broadway in 1967. He played Buddy Sorrell in the original pilot for The Dick Van Dyke Show, which was entitled Head of the Family and starred writer/creator Carl Reiner in the lead role with an entirely different cast. He also played Ann Marie's agent, a former comedian, in several episodes of That Girl. He played himself in the Woody Allen film Broadway Danny Rose.

Death
Gunty died of cancer on July 15, 1984, aged 55, in Brooklyn, New York. He was survived by his wife, Marilyn; two daughters, a brother; and his parents, Belle and Abraham Gunty.

Filmography

References

American male comedians
Jewish American male comedians
1929 births
1984 deaths
Deaths from cancer in New York (state)
People from Brooklyn
20th-century American comedians
20th-century American Jews